Kerstin-Maria Aronsson (née Lejdstrand; previously Kerstin-Maria Stalín; born 1937) is a Swedish politician and former member of the Riksdag, the national legislature. A member of the Green Party, she represented Dalarna County between October 1998 and November 2004.

Kerstin-Maria Lejdstrand married Bengt Stalín in 1961. Bengt Stalín died in 1981 but Kerstin-Maria kept the Stalín surname. That name had, however, caused issues for her due to its link with Soviet dictator Joseph Stalin. She married Hans Aronsson in 2008 and in October 2009 she changed her surname to Aronsson.

References

1937 births
20th-century Swedish women politicians
20th-century Swedish politicians
21st-century Swedish women politicians
Living people
Members of the Riksdag 1998–2002
Members of the Riksdag 2002–2006
Members of the Riksdag from the Green Party
Women members of the Riksdag